Catherine Schenk is a Canadian Professor of Economic & Social History at the History faculty of the University of Oxford. She is also a fellow at St Hilda's College Oxford. She is an associate fellow at Chatham House.

Education and career 
Catherine Schenk completed her undergraduate studies in economics at the University of Toronto. She then moved to the London School of Economics to obtain her PhD.

She started her career as a lecturer at the Victoria University of Wellington in New Zealand. She then moved to London to be a lecturer at the Royal Holloway and Bedford New College University of London.

From 1996 to 2017, she was at the University of Glasgow, first as a lecturer until 1998, senior lecturer until 2002, reader until 2004 and professor starting in 2004. In 2017, Catherine Schenk was nominated professor at the University of Oxford.

Research 
Professor Schenk's research focuses the economic history of post war Britain. He work focuses extensively on the decline of the British Empire, its currency and economy. Her frist two books focused on the declining role of sterling in the global economy: Britain and the Sterling Area: from Devaluation to Convertibility in the 1950s and The decline of sterling: managing the retreat of an international currency, 1945–1992. The first takes the perspective of the sterling area while the second book focuses more broadly on the political and economic context in Britain.

She has also been leading the research agenda on the Eurodollar market, the European dollar lending market which emerged in the 1950s. And another strand of her research focuses on the role Hong Kong played in the global economy.

References 

Living people
Canadian historians
Canadian economists
Year of birth missing (living people)